Nick Mamatas (born February 20, 1972) is an American horror, science fiction and fantasy author and editor for Haikasoru's line of translated Japanese science fiction novels for Viz Media. His fiction has been nominated for a number of awards, including several Bram Stoker Awards. He has also been recognised for his editorial work with a Bram Stoker Award, as well as World Fantasy Award and Hugo Award nominations. He funded his early writing career by producing term papers for college students, which gained him some notoriety when he described this experience in an essay for Drexel University's online magazine The Smart Set.

Biography

Nick Mamatas was born on Long Island, New York and attended Stony Brook University and New School University. He is also a graduate of the MFA program in creative and professional writing at Western Connecticut State University, which he attended only after publishing a number of books, short stories, and articles. During his early writing career he wrote not just non-fiction, but also worked in a essay mill as a ghostwriter for college students needing term papers, an experience he later described in an essay called "The Term Paper Artist". His non-fiction work has appeared in Razor Magazine, The Village Voice, and various disinformation books and BenBella Books' Smart Pop Books anthologies. His parents are Greeks from the island of Icaria.

Career and themes

Mamatas is most known for his horror and dark fiction, but claims broad influences. Writer Laird Barron described the short fictions in You Might Sleep... as running "the gamut of science fiction, fantasy, metafiction, horror, generic lit, to the realms of the effectively unclassifiable".

The Internet Review of Science Fiction, reviewing You Might Sleep, contends that "J.D. Salinger [is] an obvious but unacknowledged influence" and also compares Mamatas' work to "Lewis Carroll with an ISP, Mishima hammering out his death poem on a Blackberry or Harlan Ellison hyped up on crystal meth..." while suggesting a certain immaturity to Mamatas's themes: "Despite his tremendous gifts, Mamatas dares little. One wonders how he would handle more profound materials, how his narrative sorcery might encompass (for example) bereavement, real tragedy or loss of self through enlightenment or love."

A thematic touchstone for Mamatas is H.P. Lovecraft. His novel Move Under Ground, which combines Lovecraftian and Beat themes, was declared one of the best Cthulhu Mythos stories not written by Lovecraft by Kenneth Hite in the book Cthulhu 101. Mark Halcomb of the Village Voice reviewed the book and its peculiar meshing of Lovecraft and Kerouac, writing, in part:

"In fact, Kerouac's 'bebop prosody' and the Cthulhu mythos dovetail nicely, and what seems at first like literary stunt-casting actually gives Mamatas room to recast the Beats' fall from grace in fanciful terms unhindered by their tricky psychology, the strictures of reality and realism—or lingering platitudes."

Publishers Weekly reviewed Move Under Ground, discussing the novel's "credible pastiche" of Kerouac's voice and declared the book "sophisticated, progressive horror..."

A number of his short works, such as the novelette Real People Slash and the flash fiction "And Then And Then And Then", also explicitly combine Lovecraftian themes with the voices of non-fantastical literature.  The short story "That of Which We Speak When We Speak of the Unspeakable", first published in the anthology Lovecraft Unbound is a pastiche of Lovecraft and several of the works of Raymond Carver. The Damned Highway combines a character based heavily on Hunter S. Thompson and Lovecraftian themes.

Satire is also a significant element of Mamatas's fiction. Ed Park, writing for his online The Los Angeles Times review column, described Mamatas's Under My Roof—a short novel about the formation of a microstate on Long Island—as an "accurate, fast-moving satire that transcends mere target shooting by virtue of its narrator, Daniel’s 12-year-old son Herbie". A starred review in Publishers Weekly for the same title also highlighted the satirical elements in the work, declaring: "A big-bang ending caps the fast-paced novel, and there's much fun to be had watching Mamatas...merrily skewer his targets."

Mamatas's nonfiction work includes essays on publishing, digital culture, and politics. A Village Voice piece on the Otherkin phenomenon is cited as one of the earliest national publications on the subculture. His essay about his settlement with the RIAA for file-sharing has been cited in several law reviews, as it is a relatively rare first-person account of the process of settlement with the RIAA. Essays from The Smart Set, Village Voice, The Writer and Tim Pratt's fanzine Flytrap were compiled, along with original material, into the writing handbook Starve Better in 2011, and published by Apex Publications His essay "The Term Paper Artist" originally from The Smart Set, about his experiences as an academic ghostwriter for pay, has been discussed on National Public Radio, and reprinted in a pair of textbooks, both published by Nelson Education.

Major works

Novels
 Northern Gothic - Soft Skull Press (2001) 
 Move Under Ground - Night Shade Books (2005) 
 Under My Roof - Soft Skull Shortlit (2007) 
 Sensation - PM Press (2011) 
 The Damned Highway (with Brian Keene ) - Dark Horse (2011) 
 Bullettime - ChiZine Publications (2012) 
 Love is the Law - Dark Horse Books (2013) 
The Last Weekend:A Novel of Zombies, Booze, and Power Tools - Night Shade Books (2016 reprint) (2014) 
I Am Providence - Night Shade Books (2016) 
 Sabbath - Tor Books (2019)

Short story collections
 3000 MPH In Every Direction At Once: Stories And Essays - Wild Side Press(2003) 
 You Might Sleep... - Prime Books (2009) 
 The Nickronomicon - Innsmouth Free Press (2014) 
 The People's Republic of Everything - Tachyon Publications (2018)

Anthologies
 The Urban Bizarre  - Prime(2004) 
 Spicy Slipstream Stories (with Jay Lake) - Lethe Press (2008) 
 Haunted Legends (with Ellen Datlow) - Tor Books (2010) )
 The Future is Japanese (with Masumi Washington) - Haikasoru (2012) 
 Phantasm Japan:Fantasies Light and Dark, From and About Japan (with Masumi Washington) - Haikasoru (2014) 
 Hanzai Japan:Fantastical, Futuristic Stories of Crime From and About Japan (with Masumi Washington) - Haikasoru (2015) 
 Mixed Up: Cocktail Recipes (and Flash Fiction) for the Discerning Drinker (and Reader) -(with Molly Tanzer) - Skyhorse Publishing (2017)

Non-fiction
 Kwangju Diary  (with Jae-Eui Lee & Kap Su Seol) -  University of California Los Angeles (1999) 
 Starve Better:Surviving the Endless Horror of the Writing Life - Apex Book Company (2011) 
 Insults Every Man Should Know (Stuff You Should Know) - Quirk Books (2011) 
 Quotes Every Man Should Know (Stuff You Should Know) - Quirk Books 2013 
 The Battle Royale Slam Book:Essays on the Cult Classic by Koushun Takami (with Masumi Washington) - Haikasoru  (2014)

Poetry
 Cthulhu Senryu Prime - (2006)

Editor
 Phantom Magazine, Issue #0 (November 2005)
 Clarkesworld Magazine (August 2006-August 2008)
 Viz Media (August 2008–present)

Personal life
Mamatas is a student of Chen-style t'ai chi ch'uan. In 2012, he won a push hands competition at the 3rd Annual "Golden Gate" Chinese Martial Arts Championship in San Francisco, California. In 2015, he won the silver medal in push hands at the twenty-third Berkeley Chinese Martial Arts Tournament. In 2019, he came in second in the 19th annual Mokomoko Invitational's gi-sumo competition, in the 180+ pound division.

References

External links
 Online version of Move Under Ground
 2002 interview
 2006 interview on the Sturgeon's Law podcast
 Clarkesworld Magazine

 Story behind Bullettime - Online Essay by Nick Mamatas

21st-century American novelists
American male novelists
American horror writers
1972 births
Living people
Stony Brook University alumni
People from Brookhaven, New York
American male short story writers
American male essayists
21st-century American short story writers
21st-century American essayists
21st-century American male writers
American writers of Greek descent